Priconodon (meaning "saw cone tooth") is an extinct genus of dinosaur (perhaps nodosaurid), known from its large teeth. Its remains have been found in the Aptian-Albian age Lower Cretaceous Arundel Formation of Muirkirk, Prince George's County, Maryland, USA and the Potomac Group, also located in Maryland.

History
O. C. Marsh named the genus for USNM 2135, a large worn tooth from what was then called the Potomac Formation.  As ankylosaurians were by and large unknown at the time, he compared it to Diracodon (=Stegosaurus) teeth. It was not identified as an ankylosaurian until Walter Coombs assigned it to Nodosauridae in 1978.

In 1998 Kenneth Carpenter and James Kirkland, in a review of North American Lower Cretaceous ankylosaurs, considered it tentatively valid as an unusually large nodosaurid, larger than all those described before. Carpenter (2001) retained it as a valid nodosaurid, but did not employ it in his phylogenetic analysis. Vickaryous et al. (2004), in a review of armored dinosaurs, considered it to be dubious without comment. West and Tibert, however, followed this with a preliminary account of a morphometric study that found it to be a unique genus.

Material

Carpenter and Kirkland (1998) listed 12 additional teeth from the same area as the holotype tooth, and tentatively added a robust tibia (USNM 9154) to the genus.  They found the lack of armor found in the Arundel to be peculiar, but noted that fossils are rare in that formation anyway.

Paleobiology
As a nodosaurid, Priconodon would have been a slow, armored, quadrupedal herbivore. It would have been a large nodosaurid, but since only teeth are definitely known for the genus, size estimation has not been done.

See also

 Timeline of ankylosaur research

References

Ankylosaurs
Early Cretaceous dinosaurs of North America
Taxa named by Othniel Charles Marsh
Fossil taxa described in 1888
Paleontology in Maryland
Ornithischian genera